Vasily Zaitsev (pilot) (1910–1961), Soviet World War II flying ace
 Vasily Zaitsev (sniper) (1915–1991), Soviet World War II sniper